Latif Gandilov (born August 31, 1957, Baku, Azerbaijan) is Azerbaijani diplomat. The ambassador of Azerbaijan to Kyrgyzstan. Previously served as the ambassador of Azerbaijan to Belarus (2016-2021), China, North Korea, Mongolia (2011-2016) and Vietnam (2011-2013) residing in Beijing, and to Kazakhstan (2004-2010).

Biography
Latif Gandilov was born in Baku in the family of prominent Azerbaijani scholar Seyfaddin Gandilov.

He studied in Institute of National Economy of Azerbaijan in 1974-1978 and got Candidate of Sciences (PhD) degree in economics in 1984.

In 1986-1995 he worked as docent (associate professor) in "Economic Theory" department of Azerbaijan Technical University.

Since 1995 he is in diplomatic service, and in 2001 he received his first appointment abroad — the first secretary, and then the counsellor of Embassy of the Republic of Azerbaijan to the Republic of Turkey.

In 2004 he was appointed as the first ambassador of Azerbaijan to Kazakhstan and held this position till 2010. From 2011 to 2016 he served as the ambassador of Azerbaijan to China, North Korea, Mongolia, and Vietnam (2011-2013) with residence in Beijing. On December 21, 2016, he was appointed to his current position — the ambassador of Azerbaijan to Belarus.

Latif Gandilov is married and has 4 children.

References

Ambassadors of Azerbaijan to Kazakhstan
Living people
Place of birth missing (living people)
Ambassadors of Azerbaijan to China
Ambassadors of Azerbaijan to Belarus
1957 births
Ambassadors of Azerbaijan to Kyrgyzstan